Sainte Anne Marine National Park lies about 5 km from Victoria, the capital city of the Seychelles, and encompasses eight small islands.

History
The Marine Park was created in 1973 for the preservation of wildlife, the first of its kind in the Indian Ocean. Fishing and water-skiing are forbidden within the Marine Park area. 
in 2005 used as picnic islands for the local population is too expensive and approved opening them to hotels and resorts.

Tourism
Today the islands are known as one of the prime tourist locations in the Indian Ocean for scuba-diving, glass-bottom boat excursions and snorkeling among the coral reefs. The colorful underwater world attracts tourists from around the world who are watching here the magnificent coral gardens, reef sharks and colorful tropical fish. The main island of Ste Anne is an 87-villa resort while Cerf Island and Round Island have Creole-style restaurants.
It also has one of the largest areas of "seagrass meadows" in the Seychelles. It is very beautiful.
Local tour operators offer day trips to the Marine Park.

Geography
The national park is made up of the following islands, with areas in km²:
Ste. Anne Island, 2.19 km², with large luxury resort Club Med Seychelles
Cerf Island, 1.27 km², with a population of about 100, with three hotel-resorts (Cerf Island Marine Park Resort, Fairy Tern Chalets und L'Habitation), and restaurant Kapok Tree
Île Cachée, 0.021 km², close southeast of Cerf Island, a nesting site for seabirds
Round Island, 0.018 km², a former leper colony, with an exclusive five-star resort called "Round Island Resort" with 10 villas. 
Long Island, 0.212 km², formerly a smallpox quarantine and state prison, currently being developed into a 5 star resort 
Moyenne Island, 0.089 km², currently with no steady population after the decease of the founders of the Moyenne Island National Park (Brendon Grimshaw and assistant), and restaurant Maison Moyenne
Sèche Island (Beacon Island), 0.04 km²,
Harrison Rock (Grand Rocher) the eastern islet of the park. 
The aggregate land area of the islands of the marine national park is 3.887 km². The total marine national park area is 14.43 km².

Administration
All islands belong to Mont Fleuri District. 
Because of the small population, there are not any government buildings or services, so people who live on the islands have to go to Victoria.

Image gallery

References

External links 

 Official park Island Guide
 National Bureau of Statistics
 info
 Mahe Map 2015
 Info on the island
 Sainte Anne Marine National Park (Article and photos of the islands in the marine park)
 The Park at WordTravels
 Sainte Anne to be developed in order to pay bills

Marine parks of Seychelles
National parks of Seychelles
Protected areas established in 1973
Mont Fleuri